Tim Hardin 4 is an album by folk artist Tim Hardin, released in 1969.

Erik Jacobsen recorded these Blues songs as a demo with Tim, John Sebastian, Sticks Evans, and Bob Bushnell in 1964. They were not issued until 1969. The songs are in a straight blues style. A similar release was done by Atco on This is Tim Hardin.

Reception 

In his review for Allmusic, music critic Jim Newsom wrote "... the album holds some interest as a historical document... This is not essential listening by any means, but it's pleasant enough to hear on a lazy, cloud-covered afternoon."

Track listing 
All songs by Tim Hardin unless otherwise noted.
 "Airmobile" – 2:19 
 "Whiskey, Whiskey" – 5:39 
 "Seventh Son" (Willie Dixon) – 2:05 
 "How Long" - 4:30
 "Danville Dame" - 2:45
 "Ain't Gonna Do Without" (Part I) – 2:08
 "Ain't Gonna Do Without" (Part II) - 1:30
 "House of the Rising Sun" (Traditional)- 3:35
 "Bo Diddley" (Bo Diddley) - 2:45
 "I Can't Slow Down" - 2:27
 "Hello Baby" - 5:23

Personnel 
Tim Hardin – vocals, guitar
John Sebastian - harmonica
Bob Bushnell - bass
Sticks Evans - drums

References

External links 
Unterberger, Richie. Turn, Turn, Turn: The '60s Folk-Rock Revolution.

1969 albums
Tim Hardin albums
Verve Forecast Records albums
Albums produced by Erik Jacobsen